The 1960 American Football League Championship Game was the first AFL title game, played on New Year's Day 1961 at Jeppesen Stadium in Houston, Texas. With New Year's on Sunday, the major college bowl games were played on Monday, January 2. This was the first time that a major professional football league's playoff game was played in January rather than December.

The game matched the Eastern Division champion, the Houston Oilers (10–4), against the Western Division champion, the Los Angeles Chargers (10–4), in the first Championship Game of the new American Football League. The host Oilers were favored by 6-6½ points.

The AFL established a format in which Championship Games would be alternated each year between the Western Division winners and the Eastern Division, and while the first game was originally scheduled to be played in the 103,000 capacity Los Angeles Coliseum, the Chargers had drawn less than 10,000 fans per home game. 

With the league fearing the prospect that ABC would pull its contract because of very poor ticket sales, the Chargers, the Oilers and the League mutally agreed to move the game  to the smaller Jeppesen Stadium in Houston, where it drew a near-capacity 32,183. It rained for five days straight prior to the game.

Game summary
The Chargers led 6–0 in the first quarter on two field goals by Ben Agajanian, one of only two players (Hardy Brown) who played in the AAFC, the NFL and the AFL.  In the second period, Houston scored on a 17-yard George Blanda pass to All-AFL fullback Dave Smith, then answered a 27-yard Agajanian field goal with a 17-yard kick by Blanda.

In the final quarter, Heisman Trophy winner Billy Cannon caught a short toss from Blanda and went for an 88-yard touchdown scamper.  The Chargers, down by eight points, tried to reach the end zone on their final possession.  Had they scored they could have gone for the two-point conversion, but the clock ran out with the Chargers at the Oilers' 22-yard line.  The Oilers won the first American Football League championship, 24–16.

Box score

See also
 1960 AFL season
 AFL Championship Games
 1960 NFL Championship Game

References

1960
Los Angeles Chargers postseason
Houston Oilers postseason
Championship Game
American football competitions in Houston
American Football League Championship Game
American Football League Championship Game